The 1893 St. Louis Browns season was the team's 12th season in St. Louis, Missouri and the 2nd season in the National League. The Browns went 57–75 during the season and finished 10th in the National League.

This was the Browns' first season playing in New Sportsman's Park where they would remain until 1920.

Regular season

Season standings

Record vs. opponents

Roster

Player stats

Batting

Starters by position 
Note: Pos = Position; G = Games played; AB = At bats; H = Hits; Avg. = Batting average; HR = Home runs; RBI = Runs batted in

Other batters 
Note: G = Games played; AB = At bats; H = Hits; Avg. = Batting average; HR = Home runs; RBI = Runs batted in

Pitching

Starting pitchers 
Note: G = Games pitched; IP = Innings pitched; W = Wins; L = Losses; ERA = Earned run average; SO = Strikeouts

Other pitchers 
Note: G = Games pitched; IP = Innings pitched; W = Wins; L = Losses; ERA = Earned run average; SO = Strikeouts

Relief pitchers 
Note: G = Games pitched; W = Wins; L = Losses; SV = Saves; ERA = Earned run average; SO = Strikeouts

References 
1893 St. Louis Browns at Baseball Reference
1893 St. Louis Browns team page at www.baseball-almanac.com

St. Louis Cardinals seasons
Saint Louis Cardinals season
St Louis